Mathieu Kociak is a French researcher of nano-optics who works at the Centre National de la Recherche Scientifique. He obtained his Ph.D. from the University of Paris in 2001 in carbon nanotubes, plasmons and superconductivity and later moved to Meijo University. In 2002 he was awarded Guinier Prize from the French Physical Society and in 2012 he became a recipient of the FEI-EM award from the European Microscopy Society. He is also an author of numerous peer-reviewed articles which have appeared in such journals as Nano Letters and Applied Physics Letters among others.

References

Living people
20th-century births
University of Paris alumni
Year of birth missing (living people)